The Rio–Antirrio Bridge, officially the Charilaos Trikoupis Bridge, is one of the world's longest multi-span cable-stayed bridges and longest of the fully suspended type. It crosses the Gulf of Corinth near Patras, linking the town of Rio on the Peloponnese peninsula to Antirrio on mainland Greece by road.  It opened one day before the Athens 2004 Summer Olympics, on 12 August 2004, and was used to transport the Olympic flame.

Location
The  bridge dramatically improves access to and from the Peloponnese, which could previously be reached only by ferry or via the isthmus of Corinth in the east. Its width is —it has two vehicle lanes per direction, an emergency lane and a pedestrian walkway. However, as the former has a shorter length of main span (the length of the main span is the most common way to rank cable-stayed bridges, as the size of the main span does often correlate with the height of the towers, and the engineering complexity involved in designing and constructing the bridge) and as the latter is also supported by bearings at the pylons apart from cable stays, the Rio–Antirrio Bridge deck might be considered the longest cable-stayed "suspended" deck in the world.

This bridge is widely considered to be an engineering masterpiece, owing to several solutions applied to span the difficult site. These difficulties include deep water, insecure materials for foundations, seismic activity, the probability of tsunamis, and the expansion of the Gulf of Corinth due to plate tectonics.

Construction

Charilaos Trikoupis was a 19th-century prime minister of Greece who suggested building a bridge in the current location but Greece's finances at the time didn't permit its construction.

The bridge was planned in the mid-1990s and was built by a French-Greek consortium led by the French group Vinci SA which includes the Greek companies Hellenic Technodomiki-TEV, J&P-Avax, Athena, Proodeftiki and Pantechniki. The consortium operates the bridge under concession under its ΓΕΦΥΡΑ or ΓαλλοΕλληνικός Φορέας Υπερθαλάσσιας ζεύξης Ρίου-Αντιρίου (GEFYRA—Greek for "bridge"—or GalloEllinikós Foréas Yperthalássias zéfxis Ríou-Antiríou, French-Greek Carrier of Oversea Connection of Rio–Antirrio) subsidiary. The suspension of the blue decorative lighting was announced by the company due to the ongoing electricity crisis in Europe but also to be in line with the company's environmental strategy. The bridge's carbon footprint has been reduced by 84.5% from 2015 to 2022.

The lead architect was Berdj Mikaelian.  Site preparation and dredging began in July 1998, and construction of the massive supporting pylons in 2000. With these complete in 2003, work began on the traffic decks. Steel fabrication was undertaken by Cleveland Bridge & Engineering Company. On 21 May 2004 the main stage of construction was completed; only equipment (sidewalks, railings, etc.) and waterproofing remained to be installed.

The total cost of the bridge was about €630 million, funded by Greek state funds, the consortium, and loans by the European Investment Bank. It was finished ahead of its original schedule, which had foreseen completion between September and November 2004, and within budget. Other sources suggest the final cost was €839 million.

Inauguration
The bridge was inaugurated on 7 August 2004, a week before the opening of the 2004 Summer Olympics in Athens. Olympic torchbearers were the first to officially cross it. One of them was Otto Rehhagel, the German football coach who won the Euro 2004 Championships for Greece. Another was Costas Laliotis, the former Minister of Public Works during whose term the project had begun.

Engineering feats
Due to the peculiar conditions of the straits, several unique engineering problems needed to be considered and overcome. The water depth reaches 65 m, the seabed is mostly of loose sediment, the seismic activity and possibility of tectonic movement is significant, and the Gulf of Corinth is expanding at a rate of about 30 mm a year. In addition, the hills on either side create a wind tunnel where  winds are common.

For these reasons, special design and construction techniques were applied. Beneath each pier the seabed was first reinforced and stabilized by driving 200 hollow steel pipes vertically into the ground. The pier footings were not buried into the seabed, but rather rest on a bed of gravel meticulously leveled to an even surface (a difficult endeavor at this depth). During an earthquake, the piers can move laterally on the sea floor with the gravel bed absorbing the energy. The bridge decking is connected to the pylons using jacks and dampers to absorb movement; too rigid a connection would cause the bridge structure to fail in the event of an earthquake and too much lateral leeway would damage the piers. There is also provision for the gradual widening of the strait over the lifetime of the bridge. Protection from the effect of high winds on the decking is provided by the use of aerodynamic spoiler-like fairing and on the cables by the use of spiral Scruton strakes.

The bridge received the 2006 Outstanding Structure Award from the International Association for Bridge and Structural Engineering. In 2006 the bridge was featured in an episode of Megastructures on the National Geographic Channel.  In 2011 the bridge returned to TV in an episode of Richard Hammond's Engineering Connections. In 2015, construction of the bridge was chronicled in the first episode of the Science Channel series Impossible Engineering.

Trouble with cable links
On 28 January 2005, six months after the opening of the bridge, one of the cable links of the bridge snapped from the top of the M1 pylon and came crashing down on the deck. Traffic was immediately halted. The first investigation claimed that a fire had broken out on the top of the M1 pylon, after a lightning strike to one of the cables. The cable was immediately restored and the bridge reopened.

Monitoring system
A structural health monitoring system was installed during construction on the bridge. Still operating, it provides a 24/7 surveillance of the structure. The system has more than 100 sensors, including:
 3D accelerometers on the deck, pylons, stay cables, and on the ground to characterize wind movements and seismic tremors
 Strain gauges and load cells on the stay cables and their gussets
 Displacement sensors on the expansion joints to measure the thermal expansion of the deck
 Water-level sensors on the pylon bases to detect infiltration
 Temperature sensors in the deck to detect freezing conditions
 Linear variable differential transducer (LVDT) sensors on the stay cables to measure movement
 Load cells on the restrainers for recalibration in the event of an earthquake
 Two weather stations to measure wind intensity, direction, air temperature, and relative humidity

One specific element of the system is the ability to detect and specifically treat earthquake events.

Photography
Photography by both professional and amateur photographers or cinematographers is allowed and encouraged by the bridge management without the need for a permit, with the bridge's management often organizing special events inviting professional and amateur photographers and cinematographers to photograph the bridge and the cars or the pedestrians using it.

Gallery

References

External links

 Articles showing articulations Website in French
 Aerial Photos from Rio–Antirrio bridge
 Gefyra S.A. – official site
 
 Video of the bridge taken from cruise ship 
 Timelapse video of the bridge during Earth Hour 2011 Timelapse showing how the bridge switched off & on the lights during Earth Hour 2011.

Cable-stayed bridges in Greece
Toll bridges in Greece
Bridges completed in 2004
2004 in Greece
Buildings and structures in Patras
Transport in Patras
Bridges in Western Greece
Gulf of Corinth
Public–private partnership projects in Greece
Charilaos Trikoupis